Najabat Khan was an Indian Pathan warrior of the 18th century, and founder of a line of chiefs of Kunjpura which he was granted by Nadir Shah in 1739 and the titlehood "Nawab". Nawab Najabat Khan was killed during the Battle of Kunjpura at his fort on 17 October 1760 by the Marathas led by Ibrahim Khan Gardi during Third Battle of Panipat preparations.

Early life
Najabat Khan was born in Ghorghoshti(also called Chachh), on the east of the Sindh country. Sindh referred to the country of the Upper Indus, in the Chach or Hazara region of the Rawalpindi division of Punjab, Pakistan. Having left Sindh, he set out to "Hindustan" to seek his fortunes. Najabat Khan entered into the service of the Mughal governor of Punjab, who was then Zakariya Khan, until he was made an imperial commander and obtained a tract in Karnal. He aided Nader Shah during his invasion of Delhi, and was therefore recognized as Nawab of Karnal.

Kunjpura chiefdom
In 1748 he obtained a sanad from the Afghan conqueror Ahmed Shah Abdali, also called Durani, who was then in the height of his power in Northern India, granting him a "hereditary jagir" of 149 villages. The villages were declared to be inam, or revenue-free, and he was to enjoy thenceforth the revenue payable to the Imperial Government, subject to the obligation of maintaining order in his ilaqa or possessions. These villages were in Karnal district, and it was from this base that he fought more battles against Hill Rajas. In 1729 he founded Kujnpura and built a fort there. The fort was renowned for its strength and strategic position. He became a nawab after winning the respect of the Imperial leadership in Delhi.

In early 18th century, the Maratha Empire became the primary power in the Indian subcontinent. Afghan invader Ahmad Shah Abdali invaded north and northwestern India. Small regional powers asked for help from Abdali against the armies of Marathas, who occupied Mughal areas following the death of Mughal emperor Aurangzeb. Nawab Najabat Khan joined the army of Ahmad Shah Abdali and was killed before the Battle of Panipat in the Battle of Kunjpura, in which the Marathas defeated the Afghans. His direct descendants had embroiled in very costly legal disputes over inheritance issues - these were ultimately settled by the British colonial judiciary during the period of Crown control in India. After the partition of India, the last Nawab of Kunjpura, Nawab Ibrahim Ali Khan, migrated to Lahore in Pakistan, and died in 1953.

The Salarkhel tribe claim to be descended from Nawab Najabat Khan through his elder brother Zabita Khan. It is stated in Tareekh Kunjpura he was of the Kakarzai or Kakar tribe. Nawab Najabat Khan's elder brother Zabita Khan returned to Ghorghushti without claim to any of endowment from the land in Kunjpura. Zabita Khan's descendants now live in the town of Ghourghushti. The ancestral home in Mohalla Ishaq Zai  is still owned by the descendants of Nawab Najabat Khan's brother, which has attracted well-wishers from Kunjpura, Lahore, Karachi.

There is a mention of Nawab Najabat Khan in the Imperial Gazetteer of India V.16 that he was Ghorghusht Pathan

References

Indian people of Pashtun descent
1761 deaths
1760 deaths
History of Haryana
People from Karnal district
Year of birth unknown